Temple Israel is a Reform synagogue in Paducah, Kentucky. According to the Temple Israel website, the synagogue is home to a small Reform congregation of 32 families in 2017. 

Membership is a mix of families that have lived in Paducah for several generations, as well as those arriving in the area more recently. Owing to the relatively small size, of the congregation, Temple Israel does not have a permanent rabbi, but rather benefits from the unique points of view of student rabbis. Although Temple Israel is a Reform congregation, its members include those of Conservative and Orthodox backgrounds, who add another level of richness to the Temple Israel family.

History
The community was founded in 1864 as the Paducha Chevra Yeshrun Burial Society, and the synagogue was chartered in 1871. In 1873 it became a charter member of the Union of American Hebrew Congregations (now the Union for Reform Judaism).

Paducah's elaborate, Moorish Revival Temple was built in 1893 on the corner of Broadway and 7th Street.  The architect was Brinton B. Davis who went on to build the original buildings of Western Kentucky University. The building featured a central tower and a pair of minarets, all three topped with large onion domes (these domes were removed in the early 1930s).  There was an oriel window on the front of the tower, and three tiers of horseshoe windows.  The front entrance featured a tripartite, columned, horseshoe-arched doorway topped by a tripartite tier of horseshoe windows. This synagogue building was torn down in 1963.

The current Temple building, dedicated in May, 1963, is at the corner of Madison and Joe Clifton Drive.

According to the stone at its entrance, the Temple Israel Cemetery was established in 1859. It is located on Lone Oak Road, adjacent to Mt. Kenton Cemetery.

In 2004, the current Temple building was attacked by antisemitic activists.

References

External links
 Temple Israel website

21st-century attacks on synagogues and Jewish communal organizations in the United States
Moorish Revival synagogues
Buildings and structures in Paducah, Kentucky
Synagogues in Kentucky
Reform synagogues in Kentucky
Founding members of the Union for Reform Judaism
Moorish Revival architecture in Kentucky
Synagogues completed in 1893
Synagogues completed in 1963